David Stiff (born 20 October 1984 in Dewsbury) is an English cricketer. He is a right-handed batsman and a right-arm fast bowler. He went to school at Silcoates School, Wakefield but later moved to Batley Grammar School.

The former-Yorkshire fast bowler made headlines for a spell of bowling against Uganda of 4 for 7, identical to fellow bowler Tim Bresnan.

In 2004 Stiff decided to leave Yorkshire amid a lot of interest from other counties. He apparently had interest from a dozen counties and took the opportunity to play for Kent. He toured Australia with the Under-17s in 2001, and with the Under-19s in 2003, also playing in the Under-19s World Cup in Bangladesh.

In 2007, Stiff was released by Kent and went to Leicestershire. At the start of the 2009 season Stiff joined Somerset on a two-month trial and on 14 May 2009 he accepted an extension to his contract which would last until the end of that season.  In August 2010, Somerset's Director of Cricket, Brian Rose announced that Stiff's contract would not be renewed for the 2011 season.

References

External links
 David Stiff at ECB

1984 births
Living people
Cricketers from Dewsbury
English cricketers of the 21st century
English cricketers
Kent cricketers
Somerset cricketers
Yorkshire Cricket Board cricketers
People educated at Silcoates School